AMD PowerPlay is the brand name for a set of technologies for the reduction of the energy consumption implemented in several of AMD's graphics processing units and APUs supported by their proprietary graphics device driver "Catalyst". AMD PowerPlay is also implemented into ATI/AMD chipsets which integrated graphics and into AMD's Imageon handheld chipset, that was sold to Qualcomm in 2008.

Besides the desirable goal to reduce energy consumption, AMD PowerPlay helps to lower the noise levels created by the cooling in desktop computers and extend battery life in mobile devices. AMD PowerPlay has been succeeded by AMD PowerTune.

History
The technology was first implemented in Mobility Radeon products for notebooks, to provide a set of features to lower the power consumption of the laptop computer. The technology consists of several technologies; examples include dynamic clock adjustments when the notebook is not plugged into a power socket and allowing different backlight brightness levels of the notebook LCD monitor. The technology was updated with the release of each generation of mobile GPUs. The latest release is ATI PowerPlay 7.0.

Since the release of Radeon HD 3000 Series, PowerPlay was implemented to further reduce the power consumption of desktop GPUs.

Currently supported products
The official ATI support list lists only the ATI Radeon 3800 series desktop cards, but PowerPlay is also a listed feature of all Radeon HD 3000/4000/5000 series products. Independent reviews indicated that the latter was already lower power compared to other 3D cards, so the addition of PowerPlay to that line was clearly intended to address an increasingly power, heat and noise conscious market. The ATI Radeon HD 2600 line – which does not support PowerPlay – was being phased out in favour of the 3000 series at the same price points that also support PCI Express 2.0, DirectX 10.1 and faster GDDR3 memory.

The entire ATI Radeon Xpress line is also supported for single board computers which tend to be power sensitive and used in large installations where configuration and boot image control are major concerns.

Support for "PowerPlay" was added to the Linux kernel driver "amdgpu" on November 11, 2015.

Desktop versus laptop
The main difference between the desktop and laptop versions is that the desktop version cuts the features which are aimed at notebook usage, including variable LCD backlight brightness. The PowerPlay technology for Radeon desktop graphics features three usage scenarios: normal mode (2D mode), light gaming mode and intensive gaming mode (3D mode), replacing notebook scenarios (running on AC power or battery power). Tests indicated that the lowest core clock frequency of an RV670 GPU core can reach as low as 300 MHz with PowerPlay technology enabled.

Feature overview for AMD APUs

Feature overview for AMD graphics cards

See also
 Cool'n'Quiet & PowerNow! – power-saving technologies for CPUs
 AMD PowerXpress - power-saving technologies for multi-GPUs
NVIDIA PowerMizer, similar functionality provided in mobile GeForce products

References

External links

AMD products
AMD technologies
AMD software
Graphics processing units
Year of introduction missing